Eli as a name has two different meanings, both originating in the Hebrew Bible.

Eli can be a male given name of Hebrew origin, from Biblical  "ascent", spelled with the Hebrew letter ayin in the beginning, the name of Eli, the high priest in the Books of Samuel. It is identical to the Arabic name Ali (علي). 
It came to be used as a given name among the Puritans in the 17th century and was by them taken to the American colonies.

Eli may alternatively be an unrelated abbreviation of Hebrew names such as 
Elijah, Elias, Elisha, Eliezer, Elimelech, etc., all containing the element  , meaning "my God" and spelled with the Hebrew letter aleph in the beginning. El is the name of a Semitic deity that is used in the Bible as a name for the god of the Israelites, and -i is the suffix for the genitive form ("mine").

In the United States, the popularity of the given name Eli was hovering around rank 200 in the 1880s. It declined gradually during the late 19th and early-to-mid 20th centuries, falling below rank 700 in 1964.
In a significant revival of the name's popularity in the early 1970s, it bounced back above rank 400 in 1976. Its popularity has continued to grow since then, entering the top 100 masculine given names in the 2000s, and ranking as the 64th most popular boys' name as of 2021.

Eli is also a short form of names Elisabet, Elin, and Helena in Scandinavia, unrelated to the masculine Hebrew name Eli. The two names differ in pronunciation as well.

Hebrew given name

Biblical given name עֵלִי ("ascent") 
	
 Eli Abaev (born 1998), American-Israeli basketball player for Hapoel Be'er Sheva in the Israeli Basketball Premier League 
 Eli Bebout (born 1946), Wyoming politician
 Eli Beeding (1928-2013), US Air Force captain and rocket test subject
 Eli Whitney Blake (1795–1886), American inventor
 Eli Whitney Blake Jr. (1836–1895), American scientist
 Eli Broad (1933–2021), American billionaire, philanthropist, art collector
 Eli Metcalfe Bruce (1828–1866), philanthropist, financier and politician from Kentucky
 Eli Franklin Burton (1879–1948), Canadian physicist
 Eli Giannini (born 1956), female Australian architect and director of MGS Architects in Melbourne
 Eli Heckscher (1879–1952), Swedish economist
 Eli Jones Henkle (1825–1893), U.S. Congressman from Maryland
 Eli H. Janney (1831–1912), engineer, Confederate soldier
 Eli Langer (born 1967), Canadian artist
 Eli Lilly (1838–1898), American soldier, pharmaceutical chemist, and industrialist, founder of Eli Lilly and Company
 Eli Lilly (industrialist) (1885–1977), American industrialist, grandson of the Colonel
 Eli Long (1837–1903), General in the Union Army in the American Civil War
 Eli M. Oboler (1915–1983), librarian, Idaho State University and writer
 Eli Mohar (1948–2006), Israeli songwriter and columnist
 Eli Thomas Reich (1913–1999), US vice admiral
 Eli Salzberger (born 1960), Israeli legal scholar
 Eli M. Saulsbury (1817–1893), U.S. Senator from Delaware
 Eli Schenkel (born 1992), Canadian Olympic fencer
 Eli C. D. Shortridge (1830–1908), Governor of North Dakota
 Eli Siegel (1902–1978), Latvian-American poet, critic and philosopher
 Eli Snyman (born 1996), Zimbabwe-born South African rugby union player
 Eli Soriano (1947-2021), televangelist from the Philippines
 Eli Todd Tappan (1824–1888), American educator, mathematician, author, lawyer and newspaper editor
 Eli Terry (1772–1852), inventor and clockmaker in Connecticut
 Eli Thayer (1819–1899), member of the US House of Representatives from Massachusetts
 Eli Todd (1769–1833), pioneer in the treatment of the mentally ill in Connecticut
 Eli Velder (1925–2020), American academic
 Eli Walker (born 1992), Welsh rugby union player
 Eli L. Whiteley (1913–1986), American awarded the Medal of Honor 
 Eli Whitney (1765–1825), American inventor of the cotton gin
 Eli Erlick (born 1995), American activist

Hebrew name אלי ("my God") or names of which that is a short form

 Eli Cohen (disambiguation), multiple people 

 Eli Amir ( born 1937), Israeli writer and peace activist
 Eli Biham (born 1960), Israeli cryptographer
 Eli M. Black (Elihu) (1921–1975), American businessman
 Eli Cohen (footballer, born 1951), Israeli soccer player and manager
 Eli Dershwitz (born 1995), Under-20 World Saber Champion, U.S. Olympic saber fencer
 Eli Gorenstein (born 1952), Israeli actor, voice actor, singer and cellist
 Eli Hurvitz (Elihu, 1932-2011), Israeli industrialist
 Eli Manning (Elisha) (born 1981), American football player, 2-time super bowl MVP
Eli Morgan (born 1996), American baseball pitcher for the Cleveland Indians
 Elie Munk (1900–1981), German-born French rabbi and rabbinic scholar
 Eli Noam (born 1946), professor at Columbia University
 Eli Ohana (born 1964), Israeli football player and coach
 Eli Roth (born 1972), American film director
 Eli Sherbatov (born 1991), Canadian-Israeli ice hockey player
 Eli Wallach (1915–2014), movie actor
 Elie Wiesel (אלי ויזל; Eliezer) (1928-2016), human rights activist, Holocaust writer
 Elihu Yale  (1649–1721), benefactor of Yale University, also known as "Eli Yale"
 Eli Yatzpan (born 1965), Israeli television host and comedian
 Eli Yishai  (Eliyahu, born 1962), Israeli politician
 Eli Zuckerman (born 1973), Israeli Olympic competitive sailor
 Eli Wolf (born 1997), American football player

Fictional characters

 Eli, on Freaks and Geeks
 Eli, from Xena: Warrior Princess
 Eli, the eponymous nomad from the 2009 film The Book of Eli
 Eli, in the Swedish novel Let the Right One In
 Eli Cash, in The Royal Tenenbaums
 Eli Clark, a survivor in the video game Identity V
 Eli Dingle, on the British soap Emmerdale
Eli Ever, in novels by V.E. Schwab
Eli Gemstone, on The Righteous Gemstones
 Eli Gold, on The Good Wife
 Eli Loker, on Lie to Me
 Eli Mills, from the film Jurassic World: Fallen Kingdom
 Eli Shane, in Slugterra
 Eli Stone, title character of the American show Eli Stone
 Eli Sunday, in There Will Be Blood
 Elias "Eli" Thompson, on the American television series Boardwalk Empire
 Eli Vance, in the Half-Life video games
 Eli Vanto, in the novel Star Wars: Thrawn
 Eli Wallace, on Stargate Universe
 Eli Watkins, in Oil!

Surname
 Billy Eli (born 1962), American singer and songwriter
 Look Tin Eli (1870-1919), Chinese-American businessman
 Roger Eli (born 1965), English former footballer

Scandinavian given name
Eli in Scandinavia can also be written as Øli or Ellen.
 Eli Arnstad (born 1962), Norwegian civil servant and politician 
 Eli Fischer-Jørgensen (1911-2010), Danish professor and member of the Danish resistance movement
 Eli Kristiansen (born 1933), Norwegian politician
 Eli Rygg (born 1955), Norwegian television personality
 Eli Skolmen Ryg (born 1936), Norwegian television producer
 Eli Sollied Øveraas (born 1949), Norwegian politician

Fictional characters
 Eli Ayase, from the anime Love Live!
 Eli James, a character from the Ghost Whisperer

See also
 Ely (surname)
 Ely (given name)

References

Unisex given names
Modern names of Hebrew origin